Clivina alabama is a species of ground beetle in the subfamily Scaritinae. It was described by Bousquet in 2012.

References

alabama
Beetles described in 2012